The 1985–86 season was the 40th season in Rijeka’s history and their 24th season in the Yugoslav First League. Their 8th place finish in the 1984–85 season meant it was their 12th successive season playing in the Yugoslav First League.

Competitions

Yugoslav First League

Results summary

Results by round

Matches

First League

Source: rsssf.com

Yugoslav Cup

Source: rsssf.com

Squad statistics
Competitive matches only.  Appearances in brackets indicate numbers of times the player came on as a substitute.

See also
1985–86 Yugoslav First League
1985–86 Yugoslav Cup

References

External links
 1985–86 Yugoslav First League at rsssf.com
 Prvenstvo 1985.-86. at nk-rijeka.hr

HNK Rijeka seasons
Rijeka